Tamark; also known as Tamarg is a village in Howmeh Rural District, in the Central District of Harsin County, Kermanshah Province, Iran. At the 2006 census, its population was 1,575, in 357 families.

References 

Populated places in Harsin County